The Journal of Accounting and Public Policy is a bimonthly peer-reviewed academic journal covering the interaction between accounting and public policy. It was established in 1982 by Elsevier, who continue to publish it today. The editor-in-chief is Marco Trombetta (IE Business School).

The journal regularly publishes special issues on a focussed topic and sponsors an annual academic conference, which rotates among the IE Business School, the London School of Economics, and the Robert H. Smith School of Business.

Abstracting and indexing 
The journal is abstracted and indexed in:

According to the Journal Citation Reports, the journal has a 2017 impact factor of 1.796.

References

External links 
 

Accounting journals
Elsevier academic journals
Bimonthly journals
Publications established in 1982
English-language journals